Slogen is a mountain rising up from Hjørundfjorden in the municipality of Ørsta in Møre og Romsdal county, Norway. The mountain is located just west of the municipal boundary with Stranda and just north of the nearby mountain Jakta.  Many famous Norwegians have been on the top of this mountain, including most notably Queen Sonja of Norway.

This is largely due to its beauty, view, and the fact that it's rising directly from the fjord.

Legend has it that Slogen was first climbed in 1870 by Jon Klokk. Later on that year it was climbed by the famous climber and alpine explorer William Cecil Slingsby. The latter wrote about the view from Slogen as "one of the proudest in Europe".

See also
List of mountains of Norway

References

External links

Mountains of Møre og Romsdal
Ørsta